El Carmen Airport  is an airport serving the Bobonaza River village of Montalvo in Pastaza Province, Ecuador. The runway is within a bend of the river, and approaches to either end will cross the water.

The Montalvo-El Carmen non-directional beacon (ident: MTL) is located near the runway.

See also

List of airports in Ecuador
Transport in Ecuador

References

External links
 OpenStreetMap - El Carmen
 OurAirports - El Carmen
 FallingRain - Montalvo Airport

Airports in Ecuador